Duguna Uparwar is a village in Deegh Mandal, Sant Ravidas Nagar District, Uttar Pradesh State.

References 

Villages in Bhadohi district